Tina McKenzie (born 1973) is a business executive and former politician from Belfast in Northern Ireland.

Early life

After graduating from the University of Ulster, McKenzie started her career co-ordinating job-skills programmes for the rehabilitation of ex-offenders, working with NIACRO, Extern, and the Probation Board for Northern Ireland (PBNI). 

McKenzie undertook further studies at the Tilburg University Business School and IESE Business School at the University of Navarra. McKenzie also undertook further study at the William J. Clinton Leadership Institute at Queen's University Belfast, completing the 'Leading Effective Boards' Programme in 2015.

Political life
McKenzie returned to her native Northern Ireland in 2013 to set up Staffline Group (Ireland). Shortly after her return she joined newly formed political party NI21 and was appointed its first chair. McKenzie described herself as believing in the maintenance of the union of Britain and Northern Ireland, principally for economic reasons.

NI21 selected McKenzie as their candidate for the European election of 2014, proposing to support the region in Europe and promote jobs and economic growth. She also stood for Belfast City Council in Balmoral. She received more than 10,500 first-preference votes in the European election, however did not meet the threshold for election.

On the night of the election, some figures within the party resigned, including McKenzie, following allegations of misconduct made against party leader Basil McCrea. Shortly after, McKenzie announced she was leaving politics on the grounds that she was disillusioned.

Business life
In 2018 McKenzie was appointed the chair of the NI Policy Forum for the Federation of Small Businesses in Northern Ireland. McKenzie's appointment to the role ensured that Northern Ireland's four key business lobby groups- the Institute of Directors, the Northern Ireland Chamber of Commerce, the Confederation of British Industry and the FSB- were all headed by women.

 In January 2018, McKenzie gave evidence to the House of Lords European Union Select Committee on the impact of Brexit on businesses in Northern Ireland. 
More recently, as chair of the FSB, McKenzie has led the debate on Northern Ireland becoming the 'Singapore of the Western Hemisphere' by introducing tariff free trade between the EU and the UK. In September 2018, McKenzie and the FSB published a proposal to make Northern Ireland an 'Enhanced Economic Zone' after Brexit 

In June 2021, McKenzie was announced as a visiting professor in Ulster University's Business School, based in Belfast.

McKenzie previously held the position of Regional Director (Northern Ireland) for the Recruitment and Employment Confederation (REC), the governing body of the recruitment industry.

In 2017 McKenzie was appointed the Honorary Consul to Finland in Belfast. Her consular roles include promoting economic, political, academic and cultural relations between the Nordic region and Northern Ireland, and monitoring the rights of Finnish citizens in the area. In this role, McKenzie introduced Irish President Michael D. Higgins when he delivered the Harri Holkeri Lecture at Queen's University Belfast in 2018.

Personal life
McKenzie is married and the mother of three children.

References

1973 births
Living people
Business executives
NI21 politicians
Politicians from Belfast
Women in the politics of Northern Ireland
Catholic Unionists
21st-century politicians from Northern Ireland
20th-century politicians from Northern Ireland